Lettsville is an unincorporated community in Daviess County, Indiana, in the United States.

History
A post office was established at Lettsville in 1869, and remained in operation until it was discontinued in 1887. The founder of Lettsville was Warden C. Lett.

References

Unincorporated communities in Daviess County, Indiana
Unincorporated communities in Indiana